The 7th Florida Infantry Regiment was a Civil War regiment from Florida organized at Gainesville, in April, 1862. Its companies were recruited in the counties of Bradford, Hillsborough, Alachua, Manatee, and Marion.

During the war it served in R.C. Trigg's, Finley's, and J.A. Smith's Brigade, Army of Tennessee. The 7th took an active part in the arduous campaigns of the army from Chickamauga to Nashville, then fought its last battle at Bentonville.

Companies

Citations

References
 

 

Units and formations of the Confederate States Army from Florida